Hamish MacIntyre (born 1951) is a former New Zealand politician who at various times represented the National Party, Liberal Party, and the Alliance.

Early life
MacIntyre was born in Waipukurau in 1951. His father was Duncan MacIntyre, who was the Deputy Prime Minister to Robert Muldoon from 1981 to 1984 in the Third National Government.

Political career

He was elected to Parliament for the Manawatu seat for the National Party in 1990, winning the seat from Labour. But he was dissatisfied with the monetarist policy of Ruth Richardson, known as Ruthanasia, which the fourth National Government was following.

In 1991 MacIntyre and fellow dissident National MP Gilbert Myles and member Frank Grover formed the New Zealand Liberal Party, which soon joined the Alliance, as the new Liberal Party with two first-term MPs was having organisational difficulties. MacIntyre stayed with the Liberal Party within the (left-wing) Alliance, though Myles then joined New Zealand First.

MacIntyre lost his seat at the 1993 election then later stood as a list candidate for the Alliance in 1996, but was unsuccessful and retired from politics to become a company director.

References

1951 births
Living people
Alliance (New Zealand political party) MPs
New Zealand National Party MPs
New Zealand Liberal Party (1991) politicians
Unsuccessful candidates in the 1993 New Zealand general election
Unsuccessful candidates in the 1996 New Zealand general election
Members of the New Zealand House of Representatives
New Zealand MPs for North Island electorates
People from Waipukurau